Christophe Desjardins (24 April 1962 – 13 February 2020) was a French violist and specialist in contemporary music.

Biography 

Born in Caen, Christophe Desjardins entered the Conservatoire de Paris in 1982, at the age of 20, in Serge Collot's class. He also studied at the Hochschule der Künste in Berlin. In 1990, he was solo violist at the Théâtre de la Monnaie in Brussels.  He joined the Ensemble InterContemporain in Paris in 1990.

Desjardins premiered works for viola by Ivan Fedele, Luciano Berio, Pierre Boulez, Michael Jarrell, Michaël Levinas, Emmanuel Nunes, Jonathan Harvey, Wolfgang Rihm and Gianvincenzo Cresta.  In addition to numerous world premieres, Desjardins taught at several universities, including the Juilliard School in New York. From 2010 to 2013, he taught at the Hochschule für Musik Detmold.

Discography 
 Voix d'alto, works by Luciano Berio and Morton Feldman, Paris, AEON, 2004.
 Emmanuel Nunes, La main noire, AEON, 2007.

References

External links 
 Personal website
 Christophe Desjardin on France Musique
 Bach & Berio, by Christophe Desjardins on YouTube
 

1962 births
2020 deaths
French classical violists
Musicians from Caen
Deaths from cancer in France
20th-century French male musicians
Conservatoire de Paris alumni
Berlin University of the Arts alumni
20th-century classical musicians
20th-century French musicians
21st-century French male musicians
21st-century classical musicians
21st-century French musicians
Juilliard School faculty
Academic staff of the Hochschule für Musik Detmold
20th-century violists
21st-century violists